A shrine to the Virgin Mary (or Marian shrine) is a shrine marking an apparition or other miracle ascribed to the Blessed Virgin Mary, or a site on which is centered a historically strong Marian devotion. Such locales are often the destination of pilgrimages.

Albania
Sanctuary of Our Lady of Good Counsel, Shkodër

Algeria
Notre Dame d'Afrique, Algiers

Andorra
 Our Lady of Meritxell

Argentina

Our Lady of Luján, Luján, Buenos Aires Province
Our Lady of the Rosary of San Nicolás, San Nicolás de los Arroyos
Our Lady of Itatí, Itatí, Corrientes

Australia
 St Mary's Cathedral, Sydney
 Shrine of Our Lady of Yankalilla, South Australia
 Shrine of Our Lady of Mercy, Penrose Park, New South Wales
 Marian Valley, Shrine of Our Lady Help of Christians, Canungra, Queensland

Austria
Basilika Maria Plain, Bergheim, Salzburg
 Maria Schmolln, Braunau am Inn District, Upper Austria
Maria Taferl, Melk District, Lower Austria
Mariatrost Basilica, Graz, Styria
Mariazell Basilica, Mariazell, Styria
Marienbasilika Absam, Absam, Tirol

Belgium

 Our Lady of Banneux in Banneux, Liège Province
 Our Lady of Beauraing in Beauraing, Namur Province
 Holy Virgin in Halle, Flemish Brabant
 Our Lady of Lourdes in Oostakker, East Flanders
 Our Lady of Scherpenheuvel, Flemish Brabant
 Onze-Lieve-Vrouwebasiliek, Tongeren, Limburg
 Our Lady of Tongre, in Tongre-Notre-Dame, Hainaut Province

Bolivia
 Basilica of Our Lady of Copacabana, Copacabana

Bosnia and Herzegovina
 Our Lady of Međugorje in Međugorje, Bosnia and Herzegovina
 Our Lady of Olovo in Olovo

Brazil
 Basilica of the National Shrine of Our Lady of Aparecida, Aparecida

Canada
 Our Lady of Combermere in Ontario
 Queen of The Holy Rosary Shrine in Ajax, Ontario
 Our Lady of Czestochova Church in London, Ontario
 Our Lady of the Cape at Notre-Dame-du-Cap Basilica in Cap-de-la-Madeleine, Quebec
 Our Lady of the Rockies in Canmore, Alberta
 Our Lady of Sorrows Ukrainian Catholic Shrine at the Hill of Sorrows in Cudworth, Saskatchewan
 For a complete list, see footnote

Chile
 Our Lady of Andacollo, Andacollo

China
 Our Lady of China in Donglu
 The Virgin of Sheshan, Help of Christians in Sheshan
 Our Lady of Bliss near Guiyang, China
 The Church of Our Lady of the Rosary in Longtian
 The Church of Our Lady of Lourdes in Qingyang

Colombia
Our Lady of Las Lajas, Nariño Department
Our Lady of the Rosary of Chiquinquirá, Boyacá Department

Costa Rica
Basílica de Nuestra Señora de los Ángeles, Cartago

Croatia
 Our Lady of Marija Bistrica in Marija Bistrica
 Our Lady of Trsat in Rijeka
 Our Lady of Sinj in Sinj
 Our Lady of Voćin in Voćin
 Our Lady of Aljmaš in Aljmaš
 Our Lady of Gorica in Baška, island of Krk
 Our Lady of Remete in Remete
 Our Lady of Kloštar in Slavonski Kobaš
 Our Lady of Molve in Molve

Cuba
Our Lady of Charity, El Cobre, near Santiago de Cuba,
Our Lady of Regla, Regla, Havana
Our Lady of Candle:
Camagüey,
San Fernando de Camarones, Palmira, Cienfuegos.

Cyprus
Kykkos Monastery

Czech Republic
Pilgrimage Basilica of the Visitation of Our Lady, Hejnice
Basilica of the Visitation Statue of Our Lady (Frýdek), Frýdek-Místek
Basilica of the Assumption of Our Lady - Black Madonna of Brno

Dominican Republic 
 Basílica Catedral Nuestra Señora de la Altagracia in Higüey, La Altagracia, Dominican Republic.

Ecuador
National Shrine of Our Lady of El Cisne (Nuestra Señora de el Cisne), in El Cisne, Loja, Ecuador.
National Shrine of Our Lady of the Presentation of El Quinche, El Quinche, Pichincha Province
Archdiocesan Shrine of Our Lady of Good Success, The Church of the Convent of the Immaculate Conception of Quito, Quito Canton, Pichincha.

Egypt
Our Lady of Assiut
Our Lady of Warraq
Our Lady of Zeitoun

France

 Cathédrale Notre-Dame de Chartres in Chartres
 Clermont-Ferrand Cathedral
 Notre Dame de La Salette in La Salette: 
 Notre Dame de Bonne Délivrance in Neuilly: 
 Notre Dame de Paris in Paris 
 Basilica of Notre Dame des Victoires in Paris 
 Our Lady of Lourdes and the Sanctuary of Our Lady of Lourdes, in Lourdes
 Cathédrale Notre-Dame de Strasbourg in Strasbourg

Germany
 Shrine of St. Mary, in Aachen Cathedral. This church, frequently referred to as the Kaiserdom ("Imperial Cathedral"), is a Roman Catholic church in Aachen.
 Chapel of Grace, in Altötting, Bavaria. The first miracles attributed to praying to the Virgin Mother at this shrine were reported to have taken place in 1489.
 Chapel of Grace in Kevelaer, North Rhine-Westphalia, site of an "Image of Grace" (Gnadenbild) of St.Mary since the Thirty Years' War.

Gibraltar
 Our Lady of Europe at Europa Point, the southernmost point in Western Europe. A shrine to Mary has existed on the site since 1462.

Greece
 Our Lady of Tinos, Tinos Island, Greece's patron saint.
Panagia Ekatontapiliani, an important shrine in the island of Paros. 
 Panagia Tripiti, Town of Aigio, Peloponnese
 Autonomous Monastic State of the Holy Mountain, Mount Athos, Greece; the Mother of God is the only woman allowed.
Panahrantos (Immaculate), monastery in Andros, Cyclades, Greece.
Sumela New Monastery close to Veria, Greece, a monastery that was created in Northern Greece, in memory of the Sumela monastery, for Pontic Greeks that were expelled from the region of Trabzon in Turkey after the forced population exchange of the 1920s.

Guatemala 
 The Basilica of the Virgin of the Rosary (Temple of Santo Domingo). Guatemala city.
 The Virgin of Carmel Sanctuary. Guatemala city.

Holy Land

 The Basilica of the Annunciation, in Nazareth.
Stella Maris, Monastery, Mt Carmel, Haifa, Israel 
 The Abbey of the Dormition, also known as Church of the Dormition of Our Lady on Mount Zion, in Jerusalem.
 The Church of the Tomb of the Virgin Mary in the garden of Gethsemane, in Jerusalem
 Chapel of the Milk Grotto of Virgin Mary in Bethlehem

Honduras 
 The Basilica of Our Lady of Suyapa (Spanish: Basílica de Nuestra Señora de Suyapa or Basílica de Suyapa) in Tegucigalpa, Honduras, is the largest church in Honduras. Dedicated to the Marian apparition of Our Lady of Suyapa, it receives approximately 1.2 million pilgrims each year on February 3, arriving from other parts of Honduras and the world.

Hong Kong
 The Fatima Shrine in Rosaryhill School and Saint Albert's Priory (aka. Saint Albert the Great Priory)
 Cathedral of the Immaculate Conception

Indonesia
Graha Maria Annai Velangkanni, Medan
 Sendangsono, Central Java
 Kerep Marian Shrine, Ambarawa
 Sendang Sriningsih, Klaten
 Tritis Marian Grotto, Yogyakarta
 Lawangsih Marian Grotto, Yogyakarta
 Sendang Jatiningsih, Yogyakarta

India

 Basilica of Our Lady of Good Health, Vailankanni, Tamil Nadu
 Korattymuthy  Our Lady with Poovan Bananas, St. Mary’s Forane Church , Koratty, Kerala
 Basilica of Harihar Our Lady of Good Health, Harihar, Karnataka
 Gunadala Matha Shrine (Our Lady of Lourdes), Vijayawada, Andhra Pradesh
 Basilica of Our Lady of the Mount, Bandra, Mumbai
 St. Mary's Basilica, Bangalore Bengaluru, Karnataka
 Annai Velankanni Shrine, Besant Nagar, Chennai
 Our Lady of Snows Basilica, Tuticorin, Tamil Nadu
 National Shrine Basilica of Our Lady of Ransom, Vallarpadam, Kerala
 Shrine Of Our Lady Of Health, Khairatabad Hyderabad
 Poondi Matha Bascillica, Poondi, Tamil Nadu
 Basilica of Our Lady of Snow (Manjumatha), Pallipport, Pallippuram, Ernakulam, Kerala
 St. Thomas Church, ThumpolyThumpolyAlappuzha Alleppey Kerala 
 St. Mary's Global Marian Cathedral, Manarcaud
 St. Mary's Church Meenangadi
 Major Archiepiscopal Marth Mariam Archdeacon Pilgrim Church, Kuravilangad

Ireland
 The Basilica of Our Lady, Queen of Ireland in Knock, Ireland
 Our Lady of Dublin at Whitefriars Street Carmelite Church, Dublin

Italy

 Basilica di Santa Maria Maggiore, Rome, home of the Salus Populi Romani icon
 Holy Mary of Third Millennium at Three Fountains, Rome
 Sanctuary and Sacro Monte di Oropa, Biella, Piedmont
 Santuario di Barbana, Grado, Friuli-Venezia Giulia
 Sanctuary of Macereto, Parco Nazionale dei Monti Sibillini, Marche
 Santa Maria in Aracoeli, Rome
 Shrine of Our Lady of Bonaria, Cagliari, Sardinia
 Our Lady of the Rosary of Pompei, Pompei, Campania
 Shrine of the Holy House, Loreto, Marche
 Sanctuary of Our Lady of Montallegro, Rapallo, Liguria
 Sanctuary of Madonna dei Miracoli, Motta di Livenza, Veneto
 Shrine of Santa Maria del Fonte, Caravaggio, Lombardia

Japan
 Our Lady of Akita, Akita, Japan

Lebanon

 Our Lady of Bechouat, a Marian sanctuary in the Beqaa Valley of Lebanon.
 Our Lady of Bekaa, a Marian shrine located in Zahlé, Lebanon with panoramic views of the Beqaa Valley.
 Our Lady of the Waterfall, a Marian shrine in Jezzine, Lebanon
 Our Lady of Lebanon, a Marian shrine in Harissa, Lebanon
 Our Lady of Light, a Marian chapel in Centre Ville, Beirut in Lebanon
 Our Lady of Lourdes Monument, Ain Ebel, Lebanon
 Our Lady of Mantara, a Marian shrine in Maghdouché, Lebanon
 Our Lady of Miziara, Mother of Mercies, Zgharta, Lebanon
 Our Lady of Nourieh, a Marian shrine and monastery atop Theoprosopon in Hamat, Lebanon.
 Our Lady of the Wind, Enfeh, Lebanon

Lithuania
 Our Lady of the Gate of Dawn in Vilnius, Lithuania
Church of the Assumption of the Blessed Virgin Mary, in Pivasiunai, Lithuania
 Our Lady of Šiluva in Siluva
 Church of the Visitation of the Blessed Virgin Mary in Trakai
 Žemaičių Kalvarija, Lithuania

Malta
 Sanctuary of Our Lady of Tal-Ħerba in Birkirkara
 Sanctuary of Our Lady of Mellieħa in Mellieħa
 Sanctuary and Basilica of Our Lady of Mount Carmel in Valletta
 Sanctuary of the Blessed Virgin of Ta' Pinu in Għarb, Gozo
 Sanctuary and Basilica of Our Lady of Victories in Senglea

Malaysia
 Chapel of Our Lady of Good Health (Annai Vailankanni) Kampung Pandan Kuala Lumpur. Website: http://www.sacredheartkl.org/

Mexico
 The Basilica of Guadalupe in Mexico City, Mexico
 Basilica of San Juan de los Lagos in San Juan de los Lagos, Jalisco, Mexico
 Basilica of Our Lady of Zapopan, Zapopan, Jalisco* 
 Shrine of Our Lady of Juquila, Santa Catarina Juquila, Oaxaca

Monaco
 Cathedral of Our Lady Immaculate in Monaco City, Principality of Monaco

Montenegro
Our Lady of the Rocks, Perast

Netherlands

Our Lady Star of the Sea, Maastricht
Our Lady the Sweet Mother, 's-Hertogenbosch, St. John's Cathedral
Our Lady of Handel, Handel
The Lady of All Nations, Amsterdam
Our Lady Wealth of Joys, Oirschot
Basilica of Our Lady of the Sacred Heart, Sittard
Our Lady at Peril, Heiloo
Our Lady of the Enclosed Garden, Warfhuizen
Our Lady under the Limes, Uden
Our Lady of Ommel, Ommel
Our Lady under the Limes, Thorn
Our Lady of Frieswijk, Schalkhaar
Our Lady of Oud-Zevenaar, Oud Zevenaar
Our Lady of Bolsward, Bolsward
Our Lady of Leeuwarden, Leeuwarden
Our Lady ter Weeghe, Haastrecht
Our Lady of the sand, Roermond
Our Lady of Schilberg, Echt
Our Lady of Haarlem, Haarlem
Our Lady of Eiteren, IJsselstein
Our Lady in the Oak, Meerveldhoven
Our Lady of Aarle-Rixtel, Aarle-Rixtel

Nicaragua
 San Francisco de Cuapa
 Catedral de León (Nicaragua)

Pakistan
 National Marian Shrine, Mariamabad

Philippines

 Minor Basilica and Metropolitan Cathedral of the Immaculate Conception, Intramuros, Manila
 National Shrine of Our Mother of Perpetual Help, Baclaran, Parañaque
 National Shrine of Our Lady of the Holy Rosary of La Naval, Quezon City
 Archdiocesan Shrine of Nuestra Señora de Consolacion y Correa (San Agustin Church), Intramuros, Manila
 Virgen de los Remedios de Pampanga, Arzopispado de Pampanga, San Fernando, Pampanga
 National Shrine of Our Lady of Covadonga (San Jose Parish Church) La Trinidad, Benguet
 Our Lady, Mary Mediatrix of All Grace, Carmelite Monastery, Lipa, Batangas
 Archdiocesan Shrine of Our Lady of Caysasay, Taal, Batangas
 Minor Basilica of Our Lady of Visitation of Piat, Piat, Cagayan
 Minor Basilica of Our Lady of Peñafrancia, Naga, Camarines Sur
 Minor Basilica of Our Lady of Immaculate Conception, Malolos, Bulacan
 Shrine of Mary, Queen of Peace (EDSA Shrine), Mandaluyong
 Archdiocesan Shrine of Our Lady of Loreto, Sampaloc, Manila
 Archdiocesan Shrine of Nuestra Señora de Guia, Ermita, Manila
 Nuestra Señora de Peñafrancia de Manila, Paco, Manila
 Basilica of Our Lady of Manaoag, Manaoag, Pangasinan
 National Shrine of Mary, Help of Christians, Better Living Subdivision, Parañaque
 Immaculate Conception Cathedral, Pasig
 Immaculate Conception Cathedral of Cubao, Quezon City
 Basilica of the National Shrine of Our Lady of Mt. Carmel, New Manila, Quezon City
 Shrine of Our Lady of Mercy, Novaliches, Quezon City
 National Shrine of Our Lady of Lourdes, Quezon City
 International Shrine of Our Lady of Peace and Good Voyage, Antipolo, Rizal
 Diocesan Shrine of Our Lady of Aranzazu, San Mateo, Rizal
 Diocesan Shrine of Our Lady of Abandoned, Marikina
 Diocesan Shrine of Our Lady of Light, Cainta, Rizal 
 Diocesan Shrine of Our Lady of the Holy Rosary, Cardona, Rizal
 Diocesan Shrine of Our Lady of Salvation, Joroan, Tiwi, Albay
 National Shrine of Our Lady of the Rule, Lapu-Lapu, Cebu
 Archdiocesan Shrine of Our Lady of Guadalupe de Cebu, Guadalupe, Cebu City
 Our Lady of the Pillar, Fort Pilar, Zamboanga City
 National Shrine of Our Lady of Fatima, Marulas, Valenzuela
 National Shrine of Our Lady of the Abandoned, Santa Ana, Manila
 Minor Basilica of Our Lady of Charity, Agoo, La Union
 Shrine of Our Lady of Charity (Saint Augustine Parish Church) Bantay, Ilocos Sur
 Church of Our Lady of the Assumption, Santa Maria, Ilocos Sur
 Our Lady of Good Success, Cathedral Parish of St. Andrew, Parañaque
 Cathedral of Our Lady of the Pillar, Imus, Cavite
 Immaculate Concepcion Parish Church, Dasmariñas, Cavite
 National Shrine of Our Lady of La Salette, Biga II, Silang, Cavite
 Nuestra Señora de la Soledad de Porta Vaga (San Roque Church) Cavite City
 Diocesan Shrine of Nuestra Señora de los Dolores de Turumba, Pakil, Laguna
 Diocesan Shrine of Our Lady of Guadalupe in Extremadura, Loboc, Bohol
 National Shrine of La Virgen Divina Pastora (Three Kings Parish), Gapan, Nueva Ecija
 Shrine of La Virgen Milagrosa de Badoc Coronada, Badoc, Ilocos Norte

Poland

Portugal

 Sanctuary of Our Lady of Fátima in Fátima, Portugal
 Sanctuary of Our Lady of Sameiro in Braga, Portugal
 Sanctuary of Our Lady of Lapa, in Sernancelhe, Portugal
 Sanctuary of Our Lady of Good Health, Póvoa de Varzim, Portugal
 Sanctuary of Our Lady of Piety (Sovereign Mother), Loulé, Portugal
 Sanctuary of Our Lady of Ortiga in Fátima, Portugal
 Sanctuary of Our Lady of Nazaré, Nazaré, Portugal

Romania
Shrine of Mary Comforter of the Afflicted, Șumuleu Ciuc

Russia

 Fyodorovskaya Church, Yaroslavl
 Pokrovsky chapel in Church of St. Nicholas in Tolmachi, Moscow

Rwanda
 Shrine of Our Lady of Sorrows, Kibeho

Slovakia
 Marianka, Malacky District
Basilika Minor-Visitation of Virgin Mary-Levoca
Basilika of Birthday Virgin Mary-Zilina
Basilika of Birthday Virgin Mary-Vranov n Toplou
Our Lady of Snow-Banska Stiavnica
Our Lady of Sorrow-Petrzalka
Our Lady of Rosary-Ruzomberok-Cernova
Assumption of Virgin Mary-Bratislava-Blumental
Assumption of Virgin Mary-Bratislava-Notre Dame
Assumption of Virgin Mary-Banska Stiavnica
Assumption of Virgin Mary-Topolcany
Assumption of Virgin Mary-Pezinok
Visitation of Virgin Mary-Nitra

Serbia

 Đunis Monastery, Đunis, central Serbia
 Krušedol monastery, Fruška Gora, Vojvodina province
 Studenica Monastery, central Serbia

South Africa
Ngome Marian Shrine, KwaZulu-Natal

Slovenia 
 The National Shrine Mary Help of Christians at Brezje 
 The mantled Virgin Mary - the protector from Ptujska Gora
 Church of Our Lady of Mercy on Zaplaz
 Basilica of St. Mary, Mother of God at Sveta Gora
 Basilica of the Visitation of the Virgin Mary in Petrovče

South Korea
 Gamgok Our Lady of the Rosary Church, Gamgok-myeon, Eumseong-gun im North Chungcheong Province

Spain

 The Sanctuary of the Apparitions, in Pontevedra, Galicia
 The Sanctuary of Chandavila, in La Codosera, Extremadura
 The Sanctuary of Black Virgin of Montserrat, in Montserrat, Catalonia
 The Sanctuary of Our Lady of Covadonga, in Picos de Europa, Asturias
 The Sanctuary of Saint Mary of Guadalupe, in Province of Cáceres, Extremadura
 The Basilica of Our Lady of the Pillar, in Zaragoza, Aragón
 The Opus Dei shrine of Torreciudad, in Aragón.
 The Shrine of Our Lady of Rocío, in Andalucia
 The Basilica and Sanctuary of Our Lady of Candelaria, Tenerife, Canary Islands
 The Shrine of Our Lady of Mount Carmel of Garabandal, in Cantabrian Mountains
 The Benedictine Sanctuary of Valvanera, in La Rioja
 The Franciscan Sanctuary of Our Lady of Arantzazu, in Gipuzkoa
 The Basilica of Begoña in Bilbao
 The Shrine of Our Lady of Sorrows of Umbe, in Laukiz, near Bilbao, Biscay
 The Sanctuary of the Virgin of the Light, in Tarifa, Andalucia
 The Sanctuary of Our Lady of the Saints, in Alcalá de los Gazules, Andalucia
 The Shrine of Our Lady of Africa, Ceuta
 The Cathedral-Basilica of Our Crowned Mother of Palmar in El Palmar de Troya

Sri Lanka
Basilica of Our Lady of Lanka, in Tewatte, Ragama
Shrine of Our Lady of Madhu in Mannar district
Shrine of Our Lady of Matara in Matara

Switzerland
Shrine of Our Lady of Einsiedeln, Einsiedeln
Madonna del Sasso, Orselina

Syria
 Church of the Dormition of Our Lady
 Convent of Our Lady of Saidnaya, Saidnaya
 Lady of the Valley, Al-Nasirah

Turkey
 House of the Virgin Mary in Ephesus, Turkey, believed to be the place where Mary was taken to by St. John and lived until the Assumption. 
 Church of Mary in Ephesus, Turkey, in which the Council of Ephesus (the Third Ecumenical Council) was held in 431. 
 Life-giving Spring in Istanbul, a famous spring associated with the healing powers of the Theotokos, the feast of which is celebrated on the Friday after Easter.
Sumela monastery, an important site of pilgrimage for Pontic Greeks situated in the Trabzon region.

Ukraine
 Dzhublyk, Zakarpattia Oblast
 Pochayiv Lavra in Ukraine
 The Basilica of the Most Holy Theotokos of Zarvanytsia, Ukraine

United Kingdom
 Carfin Grotto: Carfin Grotto, Scotland's National Shrine to Our Lady of Lourdes - Carfin, North Lanarkshire, Scotland
 Ladyewell Shrine: St Mary's at Fernyhalgh and Ladyewell - The Shrine of Our Lady and the Martyrs, Fulwood, Lancashire, England
 Our Lady of Ipswich in Ipswich, England - ecumenical shrine in an Anglican church
 Our Lady of the Annunciation Church, King's Lynn - Pontifical shrine of Our Lady of Walsingham.
 Our Lady of Walsingham in Walsingham, England - Anglican and Roman Catholic National shrines
 Our Lady of Willesden in Willesden, London NW10 - Anglican and Roman Catholic shrines
 Shrine Church of Our Lady of Consolation and St Francis, West Grinstead, West Sussex
 Shrine of Our Lady of Egmanton in Egmanton, Nottinghamshire, England
 Our Lady of the Taper in Cardigan, Wales
 Shrine of Our Lady of Caversham, near Reading in Berkshire
 Shrine of Our Lady, Bradstowe
 Shrine of Our Lady in Penrhys, Wales
 Our Lady of the Assumption Shrine at the Friary, Aylesford, Kent
 Shrine of the Miraculous Relic Image of Our Lady of Guadalupe, The Holy Child & St. Joseph Catholic Church, Bedford, England
 Our Lady of Doncaster in Doncaster, England
 Our Lady of Perpetual Succour Church, Great Billing, Northamptonshire, England
 Our Lady of Westminster in Westminster Cathedral, London
 Church and Shrine of Our Lady of the Assumption and St Gregory (also known as "Church of the Assumption" and "Warwick Street Church"), Warwick Street, London W1B 5LZ

United States

Archdiocesan Marian Shrine, Milwaukee, Wisconsin
Assumption of the Blessed Virgin Mary, Basilica of the National Shrine of the; in Baltimore, Maryland
Black Madonna Shrine and Grottos, in Jefferson County, Missouri
Blessed Virgin Mary, Shrine of the; in Holy Name of Jesus Church, San Francisco, California
Cathedral of Our Lady of the Angels, Los Angeles, California 
Holy Hill National Shrine of Mary, Help of Christians, Basilica of; in Erin, Wisconsin
Immaculate Conception, Basilica of the National Shrine of the; in Washington, D.C.
Shrine of the Immaculate Conception, Atlanta, Georgia
 Immaculate Heart of Mary, National Blue Army Shrine of the; in Washington, New Jersey (see Blue Army of Our Lady of Fátima#Blue Army Shrine)
 Mary, Mother of the Church, National Shrine of; on the grounds of St. Patrick Church, Laurie, Missouri (in the Diocese of Jefferson City)
Mary, Queen of the Universe Shrine, National Shrine of; in Orlando, Florida
 Necedah Shrine, an interdicted Marian shrine in Necedah, Wisconsin.
Our Lady of Consolation, Basilica and National Shrine of, in Carey, Ohio
Our Lady of Czestochowa, National Shrine of; in Doylestown, Pennsylvania
Our Lady of Fátima shrine in Franklin Furnace, Ohio
Our Lady of Good Help, Shrine of; Brown County, Wisconsin
Our Lady of Guadalupe, Shrine of; Des Plaines, Illinois
Our Lady of Guadalupe, Shrine of; in LaCrosse, Wisconsin
Our Lady of the Island, Shrine of; in Manorville, New York
Our Lady of La Leche, Shrine of; at Mission Nombre de Dios in St. Augustine, Florida
Our Lady of La Salette, National Shrine of; in Attleboro, Massachusetts
Our Lady of Lebanon, National Shrine of; North Jackson, Ohio
 Our Lady of Loreto, in Goliad, Texas
Our Lady of Lourdes, in Emmitsburg, Maryland
Our Lady of Lourdes Belmont Abbey, Charlotte, North Carolina.
Our Lady of Lourdes, National Shrine of; in Euclid, Ohio
Our Lady of Lourdes Grotto located on the grounds of St. Francis Seminary, in St. Francis, Wisconsin
Our Lady of Lourdes Grotto located on the campus of the University of Notre Dame, in Notre Dame, Indiana
 Our Lady of Lourdes Grotto maintained by the Missionary Association of Mary Immaculate in San Antonio, Texas
Our Lady of Martyrs, Shrine of, Auriesville, New York (also known as the National Shrine of the North American Martyrs)
Our Lady of the Miraculous Medal, National Shrine of; in Perryville, Missouri
 Our Lady of Mount Carmel, National Shrine of; in Middletown, New York
Our Lady of Peace Shrine, in Santa Clara, California
Our Lady of Pompeii in New York City
 Our Lady of Prompt Succor, in New Orleans, Louisiana
Our Lady of the Rockies, in Butte, Montana
 Our Lady of the Roses, Mary Help of Mothers at Bayside, New York
Our Lady of the Snows, National Shrine of, in Belleville, Illinois
Our Lady of Sorrows, Shrine of; in Rhineland, Missouri
Our Lady of Walsingham, National Shrine of; in Williamsburg, Virginia
Our Lady of Walsingham for the Episcopal Church, National Shrine to; Grace Church, Sheboygan, Wisconsin
 Our Sorrowful Mother, National Sanctuary of; in Portland, Oregon
Queen of the Holy Rosary Memorial Shrine (in memory of military veterans) in LaSalle, Illinois
Saint Mary, Cathedral of, in Miami, Florida
 Schoenstatt Marian Shrine, in Madison, Wisconsin
For a complete list and further reading, see footnotes

Uruguay
 Cathedral Basilica of Our Lady of the Thirty-Three, Florida

Venezuela
 The Shrine of Our Lady of Betania, in the State of Miranda, Venezuela
 Our Lady of Coromoto, Guanare, Venezuela
 Our Lady of the Rosary of Chiquinquirá, Zulia, Venezuela

Vietnam
 Our Lady of La Vang in Quảng Trị, Vietnam
 Notre-Dame de Tà Pao in Binh Thuan, Vietnam

See also

List of shrines
Lourdes grotto – worldwide tributes to the French original
Marian apparition
Roman Catholic Marian churches

References

 

cs:Mariánská zjevení